Birds and the Bee9 (stylised as Birds and the BEE9) is the second mixtape by Zambian born, Australian singer/songwriter Sampa the Great. It was released in November 2017..

In February 2018, the album won the 2017 Australian Music Prize.

Reception

Kitty Empire from The Guardian said "Though swaggeringly up to date in places, her tracks sound far closer to Lauryn Hill than they do to 2017's breakout star Cardi B, nodding to reggae, soul and jazz. The complex question of identity keeps cropping up. 'How you supposed to be black down under?' Tembo wonders on 'Bye River'". Empire called the mixed tape "an intriguing appetiser".

Dan Webb from SunGenre said the album "shows great promise and moments of brilliance" but concluded with "...after repeat listens, we're still not entirely sure what to make of this album."

Track listing

Release history

References

2017 mixtape albums